Events from the year 2008 in Europe.

Events
May 21: The first all-English European Cup final saw Manchester United beat Chelsea on penalties after a 1–1 draw in Moscow's Luzhniki Stadium.
August 7–16: Russia–Georgia war
August 28: The Russian group Voina staged the Fuck for the heir Puppy Bear! performance at the Timiryazev State Biological Museum in Moscow to protest at the election of Dmitry Medvedev in the 2008 Russian presidential election.
December 6: A police officer assassinated 15-year old student Alexis Grigoropoulos. Large riots took place the following days in Greece.

Deaths

January
January 2 
George MacDonald Fraser, British author
Günter Schubert, German actor
January 3 
Jimmy Stewart, British racing driver
Werner Dollinger, German politician
January 7 – Detlef Kraus, German pianist
January 9 – John Harvey-Jones, British businessman
January 19 – Morris Maddocks, British bishop
January 30 – Jeremy Beadle, British television presenter, writer and producer

February
28 February – Mike Smith, British singer

March
8 March – Carol Barnes, British newsreader
18 March – Anthony Minghella, British film director
19 March 
Arthur C. Clarke, British science fiction author and inventor
Paul Scofield, British actor
20 March – Brian Wilde, British actor
23 March – Neil Aspinall, British record producer and business executive 
28 March – Michael Podro, British art historian

April
1 April – Jim Finney, British football referee 
7 April – Mark Speight, British television presenter 
25 April – Humphrey Lyttelton, British jazz musician and broadcaster

May
16 May – David Mitton, British producer and director
24 May – Rob Knox, British actor
28 May – Beryl Cook, British artist

July
2 July – Elizabeth Spriggs, British actress
3 July – Clive Hornby, British actor 
4 July – Charles Wheeler, British journalist 
14 July – Hugh Lloyd, British actor

August
11 August – Bill Cotton, British producer
29 August – Geoffrey Perkins, British comedy producer, writer and performer
31 August – Ken Campbell, British actor and raconteur

September
15 September – Richard Wright, British musician
24 September - Ruslan Yamadayev, Russian politician

November
3 November – Brooks Mileson, British businessman, 
4 November – Syd Lucas, British World War I veteran
12 November – Mitch Mitchell, British drummer 
16 November – Reg Varney, British actor

December
8 December – Oliver Postgate, British animator, puppeteer and writer
14 December – Kathy Staff, British actress
24 December – Harold Pinter, British playwright

References

 
2000s in Europe
Years of the 21st century in Europe